Michael C. Gruitza (born May 2, 1951) is a former Democratic member of the Pennsylvania House of Representatives.

Gruzita attended Kennedy Catholic High School, graduating in 1969.

He earned a degree from Gannon College in 1973 and a law degree from Ohio Northern University in 1977.

He was first elected to represent the 7th legislative district in the Pennsylvania House of Representatives in 1980. He retired prior to the 2006 elections.

References

External links
Pennsylvania House of Representatives - Michael Gruitza official PA House website
Pennsylvania House Democratic Caucus - Rep. Michael Gruitza official Party website

1964 births
Living people
Boston College alumni
Democratic Party members of the Pennsylvania House of Representatives
People from Hermitage, Pennsylvania
Gannon University alumni
American people of Romanian descent